Dasyuris octans is a species of moth in the family Geometridae. It is endemic to New Zealand. This moth is classified as "At Risk, Naturally Uncommon" by the Department of Conservation.

Taxonomy 
This species was first described by George Hudson in 1923 using a specimen discovered by Stewart Lindsay in the Hunter Mountains near Lake Manapouri at 4000 ft. Hudson described and illustrated the species in his 1928 publication The Butterflies and Moths of New Zealand. The lectotype is held at the Museum of New Zealand Te Papa Tongarewa.

Description 
Hudson described the species as follows:

This species can be mistaken for Dasyuris hectori but can be distinguished from that species as D. octans is smaller, much narrower and has a more orange-ocherous tint.

Distribution
This species is endemic to New Zealand. Along with the type locality, this species has been collected at Homer, as well as at the Rahine Range, Kaikoura Ranges, Jack's Pass in Hanmer, Porters Pass, Mount Cook, Macetown, Vanguard Peak and Advance Peak in Otago, Kepler Mountains and Eglinton Valley at Milford Sound.

Biology and life cycle 
This species is on the wing in December. It is a day flying moth.

Host plant and habitat 
Charles E. Clarke notes he captured specimens flying over lichen covered rocks in native grass and herb habitat.

Conservation status 
This moth is classified under the New Zealand Threat Classification system as being "At Risk, Naturally Uncommon".

References

External links 

Image of lectotype specimen held at the Museum of New Zealand Te papa Tongarewa.

Larentiinae
Moths of New Zealand
Moths described in 1923
Endemic fauna of New Zealand
Endangered biota of New Zealand
Taxa named by George Hudson
Endemic moths of New Zealand